This is a list of major political scandals in Canada.

Federal

Alberta

 Alberta and Great Waterways Railway scandal — a 1910 scandal that resulted in the resignation of the premier, Alexander Cameron Rutherford
 The Liberal Government over-spending on telephone poles and other unneeded expenses prior to its forced departure from power in 1921
 Sexual Sterilization Act of Alberta — a 1928 law that, over a period of four decades, resulted in close to 3,000 young people being classified as "mentally unfit" and without their knowledge or consent were sterilized to prevent them from breeding their "bad blood."
 John Brownlee sex scandal — John Edward Brownlee, Premier of Alberta, sued for the seduction of a young woman and found guilty (1935) forcing his resignation
 Dar Heatherington — forced to resign from Lethbridge City Council in 2004 after being convicted of public mischief.
 Alison Redford's expense scandal — forced to resign Premiership in 2014 after multiple expense scandals came to light
Kamikaze campaign scandal — an investigation into allegations that Jason Kenney orchestrating Jeff Callaway's campaign for the leadership of the United Conservative Party in an attempt to harm Kenney's biggest rival, Brian Jean.

British Columbia 
 Sommers Affair (British Columbia Social Credit Party) — influence peddling and abuse of privilege on timber licenses by Forest Minister
 Gracie's Finger (Social Credit Party) — gerrymandering in Vancouver-Little Mountain
 Lillooet Cattle Trail — cost overruns, poor design and other scandalous aspects on most expensive provincial infrastructure project in the 19th century
 Solidarity Crisis — crisis was launched by Premier Bill Bennett overstaying his mandate, triggering a constitutional crisis
 Fantasy Gardens (Social Credit Party) — improper sale of property and influence-peddling by Premier Bill Vander Zalm, in connection with Asian gambling lord Tan Yu
 Stephen Rogers (Social Credit Party) — resigned as environment minister after a conflict of interest due to owning shares in a company
 Cliff Michael (Social Credit Party) — resigned from cabinet due to conflict of interest over the sale of some land
 Reid Affair (Social Credit Party) — Bill Reid forced to resign after a report showed that he was diverting lottery funds into a company owned by his former campaign manager
 Bud Smith (Social Credit Party) — resigned after tapes and transcripts of him talking disparagingly about a lawyer hired by the opposition NDP to investigate the Reid Affair.
 Robin Blencoe (New Democratic Party of British Columbia) — allegations of harassing an office employee.
 Phil Gaglardi (Social Credit Party) — improper use of expenses
 British Columbia Resources Investment Corporation (BCRIC or "Brick") (BC Social Credit Party) — public boondoggle involving publicly distributed and soon-worthless shares of the former Crown Corporation
 Bingogate (NDP), 1990s — former MLA and MP David Stupich used money that was raised by a charity bingo to fund the Party. Mike Harcourt resigned as premier in February 1996 as result.
 Doman Scandal (Social Credit Party) — insider trading; Premier Bill Bennett and his brother Russell James Bennett had trading sanctions imposed against them and Harbanse Singh Doman, and were ordered to pay the British Columbia Securities Commission $1 million to cover the costs of an insider trading case that spanned 11 years
 Coquihalla Highway (Social Credit Party) — cost overruns and graft
 Casinogate (NDP) — Premier Glen Clark was charged but acquitted of breach of trust in connection with his official duties.  Collusion between Global television and the RCMP in trying to incriminate Clark is alleged by many commentators. Dimitros Pilarinos was convicted of providing a benefit to the Premier, and the BC Conflict of Interest Commissioner concluded "Receipt of such a benefit left Mr. Clark, albeit perhaps unwillingly, indebted to Mr. Pilarinos and meant that he might properly be considered to have an interest in seeing Mr. Pilarinos compensated in some way." 
 FastCat Fiasco (aka "Ferrygate" or simply "the Fast Ferries"), 1990s — construction of a fleet of high speed ferry vessels that ended up being massively over-budget and actually slower than existing ferries
 Wilson–Tyabji Affair (British Columbia Liberal Party) — semi-secret romance between Opposition Leader Gordon Wilson and his House Whip Judy Tyabji leads to their downfall
 BC Legislature Raids ("Railgate") (Liberals) — raids on offices of senior political aides in the legislature connected to everything from marijuana grow-ops to allegations of influence peddling and money laundering in the sale of BC Rail to Canadian National.
BC Premier arrested in Hawaii for DUI (Liberals), 2003 — BC Premier Gordon Campbell was arrested and pleaded no contest for driving under the influence of alcohol while vacationing in Hawaii.  Campbell was also implicated in Railgate (see previous).
 2012-2013: Misfire Scandal: Under the leadership of Margaret MacDiarmid, BC Liberal Minister, Ministry of Health fires a number of employees and contractors on false pretences in what was dubbed the biggest Human Resources scandal in the history of British Columbia. The Ombudsperson investigated the matter and found that the BC Health Ministry, under the leadership of Margaret MacDiarmid, committed a number of wrongdoings. The case resulted in financial compensations, government apology and an endowment educational funding by the BC Government in memory of a worker who committed suicide after false accusations were laid against him, and led to his dismissal.
 Quick Wins ethnic outreach scandal (Liberals), 2013 — resignation of Minister John Yap and Deputy Chief of Staff for Premier Christy Clark due to use of public servants' time and resources for partisan purposes.

Manitoba

 Legislature scandal (Conservatives), 1915 — the construction of the Manitoba Legislative Building came with allegations of materials being stolen and over-expenditure of public funds by the Manitoba Conservatives. The scandal led to a royal commission investigating the building's construction, subsequently bring on the resignation of Premier Rodmond Roblin.
 Vote-rigging scandal (Conservatives), 1998 — Premier Gary Filmon and the Conservative Party of Manitoba were accused of attempting, during the 1995 Manitoba election, to siphon off votes from the NDP by paying independent Aboriginal candidates, Independent Native Voice, to run in areas with high numbers of Aboriginal voters. This story ultimately surfaced in 1998. Several of Filmon's staff were implicated, though Filmon himself was not. Implicated in the scheme were: Taras Sokolyk, Filmon's chief of staff, who admitted to using $4,000 in party funds for it; Allan Aitken, a campaign manager who passed the money to 3 independent candidates; and Gordon McFarlane and Julian Benson, who helped cover up the plan. Independent Native Voice was established in 1995, but ceased to exist after that year. Filmon resigned as Conservative leader in 2000.

New Brunswick
 Karl Toft — serial pedophile molested over 200 boys while an employee in charge at the government run New Brunswick Training School between the mid-1960s and the mid-1980s
Hatfield weed bust, 1984 — Richard Hatfield, the Premier of New Brunswick, was charged with possession of marijuana.

Newfoundland and Labrador
 A 1969 agreement by Premier Joey Smallwood locking Newfoundland into selling electricity from the power dam at Labrador's Churchill Falls to Quebec until the year 2041—at a fixed rate that is now roughly one-tenth of the market price. 
 Mount Cashel sex abuse scandal — Canada's largest sexual abuse scandal was disclosed in 1989, resulting in the closure of the facility in 1990. 
 Davis Inlet, 1992/93 — In 1992, 6 unattended children, aged between 6 months and 9 years, died in a house fire while their parents were drinking at a Valentine's Day dance. In 1993, a video was released to the media of six children in Davis Inlet between the ages of 11 and 14 huffing gasoline in an unheated shack in winter and shouting that they wanted to die. Shamed by the negative publicity and international outcry surrounding the events in 1993, the Canadian government agreed to move the Innu to Natuashish.
 Cameron Inquiry — In May 2005, Eastern Health discovered errors in hormone receptor breast cancer test results from a histology lab in St. John's. After retesting, Eastern Health concluded that 386 patients had received erroneous results between 1997 and 2005. The provincial government then called a judicial inquiry, between November 2007 and October 2008, into Eastern Health's actions. A $17.5 million settlement was reached in 2009.
 Humber Valley Paving scandal — Humber Valley Paving requests the termination of a $19M paving contract in Labrador. The request to cancel the contract is granted. HVP gets paid $12M for road preparations and paving, despite only completing 20 km out of the 80 km that was required. HVP have both their $9.5M performance bond and $9.5M labor/materials bond returned without any penalty. Transportation and Works Minister Nick McGrath resigns over the scandal.
 Muskrat Falls hydroelectric project cost overruns — The cost of the Muskrat Falls dam doubled to more than $12.7 billion since it was sanctioned in 2012. The provincial government called a public inquiry which took place between 2018 and 2020. In the inquiry report Commissioner Richard LeBlanc concluded the government failed its duty to residents by predetermining that the megaproject would proceed no matter what. In his report, LeBlanc concluded that the business case, which assumed the Muskrat Falls project was the lowest-cost power option, was “questionable.” He stated that the project's economics were not sufficiently tested and that Nalcor failed to consider all potentially viable power options. LeBlanc stated that Nalcor concealed information that could have undermined the business case for the project from the public and government.
 Carla Foote scandal, 2019 — On 5 December 2019, the House of Assembly voted to reprimand TCII Minister Chris Mitchelmore for his hiring of Carla Foote, daughter of Judy Foote, at The Rooms despite her lack of qualifications and her political connections to the Liberals. The House of Assembly ordered that Mitchelmore apologize to the Board of Directors of The Rooms, to the House of Assembly, and also be suspended two-week without pay.

Nova Scotia
Thornhill Affair — involved Roland Thornhill, who resigned as Deputy Premier in the 1990s after allegations dealing with a debt settlement from 1980 was brought into question.
Billy Joe MacLean Affair (The BJM Affair) — MLA Billy Joe MacLean was expelled from the Assembly after Premier John Buchanan's Progressive Conservative government introduced legislation prohibiting anyone from sitting in the assembly who had been convicted of an indictable offence punishable by imprisonment for more than five years. MacLean pleaded guilty to four counts of submitting forged documents—went to the Supreme Court of Nova Scotia, which upheld Macleans expulsion, but declared the law that prohibited him from running as a candidate to be unconstitutional—MacLean was re-elected in a by-election in 1987. He was subsequently defeated in the 1988 general election by Danny Graham (Liberal).
Buchanan patronage scandals, 1990 — Michael Zareski, a former Deputy Minister, testified against Premier John Buchanan's government in June 1990 of pervasive patronage within his government. One of the many scandals included an order of 200 special machines that dispensed disposable plastic toilet-seat covers that never ended up being used.
Westray Mine — Dangerous practices by mining companies resulted in the death of 26 miners.

Ontario
 Ontario Bond Scandal (United Farmers of Ontario), early 1920s
 Patti Starr scandal — illegal use of charitable funds in the late 1980s for political campaigns donations.
 Ipperwash Crisis — incident involving the shooting death of Dudley George, an unarmed Native activist, by an Ontario Provincial Police officer in 1995 which led to the Ipperwash Inquiry
 Kimberly Rogers — After a welfare fraud conviction, Rogers committed suicide in her Sudbury apartment while under house arrest in 2001, leading to extensive controversy around the Mike Harris government's 1996 welfare reforms, as well as an inquest which made several still-unimplemented recommendations for changes to the system.
 Toronto Computer Leasing Inquiry, 1999 — judicial inquiry into improper computer leasing contracts made by Toronto's municipal government
 Walkerton water scandal, 2000
 Hells Angels in Toronto, 2002— Hells Angels come to Toronto and are welcomed by Mayor Mel Lastman.
 Toronto Police drug scandal, 2004 — multiple scandals broke out in early 2004, as a result of internal affairs and RCMP investigations. Allegations of the sale of narcotics, fake search warrants, raid tip-offs and mob gambling debts involved many dozens of Toronto police officers, including former chief William J. McCormack's son, Michael, who was eventually brought up on 23 charges. As a result of the scandal, the plainclothes downtown unit which many of the charged officers worked out of was disbanded. The court cases relating to these charges continue.
ORNGE scandal, 2011 — Ornge was involved in a controversy regarding executives compensation, including President and CEO Chris Mazza. Mazza went on an indefinite medical leave on 22 December 2011 at the height of the scandal. The Toronto Star uncovered that Mazza was receiving $1.4 million a year while remaining off the sunshine list of public employees earning over $100,000. That salary made him the highest publicly paid official in the province. Ontario Health Minister Deb Matthews stated that Mazza's salary was "outrageous, shocking and unacceptable". Ornge Global, Ornge's for-profit division, also received $6.7 million in a contract from Anglo-Italian helicopter manufacturer AgustaWestland, which is also part of the audit by the provincial auditor general. On 16 February 2012 Ornge formally became the subject of an Ontario Provincial Police investigation for "financial irregularities".
 Ontario power plant scandal — In 2011, plans to construct a gas-fired power plant in an environmentally sensitive area of Mississauga had some residents up in arms. After weeks of continual protest from concerned community activists in Mississauga and Oakville, the Ontario Liberals decided to cancel the gas plants. NDP MPPs claimed the decision was not motivated by environmental concerns but rather political ones.
 Rob Ford crack video scandal, 2013 May
 Rod Phillips secret vacation — Rod Phillips, the Finance Minister of Ontario, resigned after it came to light he had been on vacation in Saint Barthélemy when the province had been in lockdown during the COVID-19 pandemic.

Quebec
 Duplessis Orphans — Maurice Duplessis' government and the Roman Catholic Church, between the 1940s through the 1960s, wrongly classified children as mentally ill.
 Charbonneau Commission — 2011-2012 inquiry into the Quebec construction industry

Saskatchewan
 Expenses scandal (Progressive Conservatives) — scandals that emerged in the 1990s involving Grant Devine's Progressive Conservative government implicating 16 MLAs, with the chief conviction that of Deputy Premier Eric Berntson in 1999.
 Thatcher murder scandal — Colin Thatcher a politician who was convicted for the murder of his ex-wife, JoAnn Wilson. 
 Saskatchewan Potato Utility Development Company ("SPUDCO") — a publicly owned potato company that was inappropriately characterized as a public-private partnership.
 GTH scandal — a land purchase that disproportionately benefited businessmen with personal ties to Saskatchewan Party MLA Bill Boyd

References

Canada
Scandals